Miodrag "Mike" Belosevic,  is a professor of immunology in the University of Alberta Department of Biological Sciences. In 2008, he was elected as a fellow of the Royal Society of Canada.

References

External links
 University home page
 Google Scholar profile

Living people
Canadian immunologists
Fellows of the Royal Society of Canada
Year of birth missing (living people)
Place of birth missing (living people)
Academic staff of the University of Alberta
Canadian people of Serbian descent
Presidents of the Canadian Society of Zoologists